Lac Sante is a lake best known for boating and other watersports. Lac Sante has two public boat launches, one in each County. There is also a public day use area at the Two Hills county boat launch.

In 1993 it was home to 150 breeding western grebes but by 2008 there were none left.

References

External links
 Lac Sante, Alberta - Boundary (GIS data, polygon features) from Open government portal, Government of Alberta

Sante
County of St. Paul No. 19
County of Two Hills No. 21